Paragpur is a village in Shaheed Bhagat Singh Nagar district of Punjab, It is located  away from postal head office Mukandpur,  from Banga,  from district headquarter Shaheed Bhagat Singh Nagar and  from state capital Chandigarh. The village is administrated by Sarpanch an elected representative of the village.

Demography 
As of 2011, Paragpur has a total number of 114 houses and population of 574 of which 283 include are males while 291 are females according to the report published by Census India in 2011. The literacy rate of Paragpur is 80.28%, higher than the state average of 75.84%. The population of children under the age of 6 years is 67 which is 11.67% of total population of Paragpur, and child sex ratio is approximately 1233 as compared to Punjab state average of 846.

Most of the people are from Schedule Caste which constitutes 76.83% of total population in Paragpur. The town does not have any Schedule Tribe population so far.

As per the report published by Census India in 2011, 161 people were engaged in work activities out of the total population of Paragpur which includes 151 males and 10 females. According to census survey report 2011, 79.50% workers describe their work as main work and 20.50% workers are involved in Marginal activity providing livelihood for less than 6 months.

Education 
The village has a Punjabi medium, co-ed primary school founded in 1972. The schools provide mid-day meal as per Indian Midday Meal Scheme. As per Right of Children to Free and Compulsory Education Act the school provide free education to children between the ages of 6 and 14.

Sikh National College Banga and Amardeep Singh Shergill Memorial college Mukandpur are the nearest colleges.

Landmarks and history 
The village has a historical dargah Panj Peer dedicated to the five peers. It was earlier ruled by Mughals. The dargah is nearby the Sikh shrine Gurudwara Shri Panj Tirath Sahib which was named by Guru Hargobind and it was built by Maharaja Ranjit Singh in Laroya. A religious fair held at the dargah annually which attended by people of all religions.

Transport 

See also 
List of villages in India

References

External links 
 Tourism of Punjab
 Census of Punjab
 Locality Based PINCode

Villages in Shaheed Bhagat Singh Nagar district